Alberto Sánchez Martínez (born 8 October 1980), known as Chupri, is a Spanish retired footballer who played as a right back.

External links

1980 births
Living people
Sportspeople from the Province of Palencia
Spanish footballers
Footballers from Castile and León
Association football defenders
Segunda División players
Segunda División B players
Tercera División players
UD Salamanca players
Real Unión footballers
SD Ponferradina players
Mérida UD footballers
Lorca Deportiva CF footballers
CF Palencia footballers